The 47-foot MLB is the standard lifeboat of the United States Coast Guard (USCG). The 47′ MLB is the successor to the 44′ MLB. 

At Station Chatham where the new 47-foot boat would draw too much to get over the bar, the 42-foot Near Shore Lifeboat was designed to replace the 44' MLB. 

If the boat should capsize, it self-rights in less than ten seconds with all equipment fully functional.

The boat's hull and superstructure are constructed entirely from 5456 marine grade aluminum. Designed with a hard chined deep "V" planing hull, the 47′ MLB exceeds its hull speed. The frame is composed of 17 vertical bulkhead frames, each of which is welded to the deck and hull, and five of which are watertight.

Employing "fly-by-wire" control systems, the boat can be operated from four different locations: two from the enclosed bridge, and two amidships from an open bridge. Because of the “by wire” system the boat is controlled by joysticks instead of wheels.

A watertight survivor's compartment is equipped for comprehensive first aid. It is situated at the combined center of rotation of the ship. if needed a light machine gun can be fitted at the front of the vessel.

See also 
 41-foot Utility Boat, Large
 44-foot Motor Lifeboat
 Cape-class motor lifeboat (the 47′ MLB in service with the Canadian Coast Guard)
 Response Boat – Medium
 Trent-class lifeboat—RNLI lifeboat of similar size and performance

References

External links 
 US Coast Guard datasheet on the 47 MLB
 Textron Marine datasheet on the 47 MLB—contractor for the USCG 47 MLB
 MetalCraft Marine—contractor for the CCG 47 MLB
 47-Foot Motor Lifeboat - MLB at military.com

Motor Lifeboat
Motor lifeboats of the United States